Eugene M. "Gene" Moore (July 19, 1942 – June 14, 2016) was a politician who served both as Cook County recorder of deeds and as a member of the Illinois House of Representatives.

Early life
Moore was born July 19, 1942 in Baltzer, Mississippi, the son of Sara Ella Burrell and Joseph Moore.

When Moore was a young child, his family moved to Maywood, Illinois. Moore would from then on be a lifelong resident of Maywood.

Moore attended Maywood's Washington Elementary School. Moore graduated from Proviso East High School.

Moore earned a football scholarship to Otero Junior College. However, an injury ended his football career at Otero, and he returned to Maywood. A family member, after Moore's death, would share their belief that Moore had left Otero Junior College mostly due to feeling homesick and desiring to return to his high school sweetheart, who he would eventually marry.

Moore worked for some time with the American Can Company in Maywood. He then began what would be a long career as an account manager at Metropolitan Life Insurance.

Early political career
In the 1980s, Moore became active in Democratic Party politics. He first ran unsuccessfully be a Maywood trustee. In 1988, Moore was elected a Proviso Township trustee.

State Representative
Elected in 1992, Moore became the first African American to represent the 7th district in the Illinois House of Representatives. Moore had successfully run in a district that had been redistricted in such a way as to make it feasible for the Proviso area to elect a black representative. His candidacy received support from individuals such as then-Cook County commissioner Danny K. Davis.

In 1998, Moore fended off a serious primary challenge by Karen Yarbrough. Also in 1998, he was elected Proviso Township Democratic committeeman, unseating Gary G. Marinaro. He would hold this party post in addition to his other offices until 2006, when he would be unseated from this party post.

Cook County Recorder of Deeds
In January 1999, Moore was appointed Cook County recorder of deeds, filling the vacancy left when Jesse White resigned to become Illinois Secretary of State. His appointment to replace White as recorder of deeds had been backed by county political heavyweights such as John Stroger and John P. Daley. Moore would be elected outright to his first full term in 2000, and subsequently reelected again to additional terms in 2004 and 2008.

Moore worked to overhaul the office's efforts to fight property fraud and theft. He also worked to modernize the data-collecting and processing capabilities of the office.

In 2006, Karen Yarbrough defeated Moore to become the Democratic committeeman for Proviso Township. Yarbrough had previously unsuccessfully challenged Moore for the post of Proviso Township Democratic committeeman in 2002.

Moore retired in 2012, with fellow Democrat Karen Yarbrough being elected to succeed him as Cook County recorder of deeds in that year's election.

Nonprofit work
Moore was active in local charities and organizations, including the Boys & Girls Club of West Cook County and John C. Vaughn Scholarship Fund.

Personal life
Moore was divorced from his former wife. Moore had three children, daughters Dowanna and Natalie and son Eric. At the time of his death, he had six grandchildren.

Moore's primary nicknames were "Gene" and "Geno".

Moore's chief hobby was said to have been dancing.

Death
Moore died on June 14, 2016 in Maywood, Illinois of prostate cancer, which he had been fighting for a long time, and which had recently metastasized to his bones. His funeral, held June 17 at Maywood's Second Baptist Church, of which Moore had been a longtime member and had been baptized as a kid, was attended by more than 1,400 mourners.

Electoral history

Illinois House of Representatives
1992

1994

1996

1998

Proviso Township Democratic committeeman

Cook County Recorder of Deeds
2000

2004

2008

References

Cook County Recorders of Deeds
Democratic Party members of the Illinois House of Representatives
1942 births
2016 deaths
Deaths from prostate cancer
African-American state legislators in Illinois
People from Maywood, Illinois
20th-century African-American people
21st-century African-American people